Bonaventura Somma ( Chianciano Terme 30 July 1893 – Rome 23 October 1960) was an Italian Romantic composer, conductor and organist.

Life
Bonaventura Somma was born in Chianciano Terme - small town located in the province of Siena, on July 30, 1893. As a young man he attended the conservatory in Rome, where he was trained in music, having been a student of various modern composers including Ottorino Respighi.

After finishing his studies, he became a professor for many years at the Conservatory of Santa Cecilia in Rome and directed the Choirs of the “Augusteo” for several years. Always in Rome, he founded the Polyphonic Choir of the Accademia di Santa Cecilia, in which he was permanent director until end of his life. He also worked with the most important conductors and composers of his time (Karajan, Toscanini, Perosi, etc.).

For many years he was director of the Musical Chapel of San Luigi dei Francesi.

Choirs 

 Requiem Mass
 Pentecost
 Hail Mary
 Symphony and Variations

Revisions and transcripts 
Somma carried out an intense activity of transcription and revision of XVI to XVII century scores for choir, including several Palestrina's Masses and Madrigal works by Banchieri stand out.

Bibliography 

 “SOMMA, Bonaventure”, in the Italian Encyclopedia - III Appendix, Rome, Institute of the Italian Encyclopedia, 1961.

Somma studied at Conservatorio di Santa Cecilia in Rome con R. Renzi, C. Dobici, S. Falchi e Ottorino Respighi.
He was Mestro at Shrine of the Virgin of the Rosary of Pompei (1911), organist at the Waldensian Evangelical Church of Rome and for many years Maestro of San Luigi dei Francesi.

Compositions

Missa in honorem Sanctae Ritae e Cassia binis vocibus paribus organo vel harmonio comitante, 1938
Missa in honorem Beatae Mariae Virginis sub titulo "Salus infirmorum" ad chorum duarum, trium et quatuor vocum virilium cun organo vel harmonio
Missa pro defunctis tribus vocibus inaequalibus organo comitante concinenda, 1939
Missa in honorem Sanctae Clarae Assisiensis, ad chorum duarum, trium et quattuor vocum aequalium cum organo vel harmonio, 1954
Ave Maria, per coro a 4 voci virili con accompagnamento d'organo o d'armonio
Beatus vir, Salmo solenne per coro a tre voci virili con organo od armonio
Canti eucaristici: Adoro te devote. Tantum ergo. O salutaris hostia. Per coro ad una voce Media con organo od armonio, 1937
Ego sum panis vivus. Motectum unius vocis mediae organo vel harmonio comitante
Flos carmeli. Mottetto Mariano per coro a due voci eguali con organo od armonio
Gaudeamus. Introito-mottetto per coro a due voci eguali con organo od armonio
Nenia. Pastorale. A tre voci miste (C. T. Br. ) con accompagnamento d'organo od armonio
Nenia pastorale a 5 voci dispari senza accompagnamento
Nenia pastorale, a due voci pari, con accompagnamento d'organo o d'armonio
O salutaris hostia,  motectum ad chorum quinque vocum inaequalium 
Pater noster. Coro accademico a due voci eguali con pianoforte
Storia d'amore (racconto d'inverno), per violino e pianoforte
Stornelli delle Stagioni, per canto e piano
2 canti per bambini : a 4 voci pari
3 canti per bambini : a 4 voci pari
Flores apparuerunt : motectum
Due canti eucaristici : per coro a 2 voci eguali con organo od armonio
Leggenda pastorale
Il codino traditore : Scherzo a tre voci bianche
La neve : Corettino ad una voce Media con accompagnamento di pianoforte.
Burlesca, per orchestrina
Canzone per organo
Leggenda pastorale per organo
Suite francescana per organo
Dirigatur, domine, oratio mea, sicut incensum in conspectu tuo. Momenti spirituali per organo od armonio
Toccata per organo

References

Sources
 Biography at Carrara Editions 
 «SOMMA, Bonaventura», in Enciclopedia Italiana - III Appendice, Roma, Istituto dell'Enciclopedia Italiana, 1961.

External links

1893 births
1960 deaths
Italian classical composers
Italian male classical composers
Italian Romantic composers
20th-century classical composers
Italian classical organists
Male classical organists
Composers for pipe organ
People from Siena
Cecilian composers
20th-century organists
20th-century Italian composers
20th-century Italian male musicians
19th-century Italian male musicians